Mohammad Bagheri Motamed (Persian: محمد باقری معتمد‎, born January 24, 1986, in Ray, Iran) is a former Iranian professional taekwondo athlete. He won the gold medal in the featherweight division (-68 kg) at the 2009 World Taekwondo Championships in ۱ Copenhagen, Denmark and the Olympic Silver Medal at the London 2012 Olympics. ۲

Olympic 2012 London 
He competed in the 2012 London Olympics and defeated David Boy of the Central African Republic in the first game. In the second game, Ruhollah Nikpa, the bronze medalist of the Beijing Olympics, was defeated, and in the fourth game, he won 5-5 against the Brazilian opponent with the votes of the judges. Won the silver medal at the London Olympics.۱۲

Biography 
He started Taekwondo at the age of six and soon joined the national team. 1 Motamed joined the national team in 2001 and won 1 silver medal in the Taekwondo World Cup, 1 gold, 1 silver and 1 bronze in the Asian Championship. He also won 1 silver in the World Student Championships, 2 gold and 1 silver in the World Student Olympiad, and 1 silver in the 2012 Olympics. 2

Mohammad Bagheri Motamed won a gold medal in the 68 kg weight category at the Guangzhou Asian Games.

Mohammad Bagheri Motamed lives in Tehran and his father and brother are also taekwondo athletes. He officially accepted the citizenship of Azerbaijan in 2016 and was scheduled to work with the Azerbaijani Taekwondo team. 3

References
1. World Taekwondo Federation

2. Mohammad Bagheri Motamed Taekwondo at the 2012 Summer Olympics – Men's 68 kg gold medal Reuters via Mohammad Bagheri Motamed (August 9, 2012). Retrieved
3. Mohammad Bagheri Motamed at www.olympic.ir
4. Mohammad Bagheri Motamed www.tekvabdowdeta.com
5.http://www.payvand.com/news/11/may/1038.html
6. https://www.insidethegames.biz/articles/1104531/irans-hadipour-opts-against-acl-surgery
7. Silver medalist Mohammad Bagheri Motamed at Olympic Games 2012 London
8. https://en.irna.ir/news/80952896/Iran-grabs-3-bronze-medals-in-Manchester-Grand-Priz
9. https://theiranproject.com/blog/2013/12/16/iran-grabs-3-bronze-medals-in-manchester-grand-priz/?amp=1
10. http://en.mastkd.com/2012/07/irans-national-taekwondo-team-training-camp/
11. https://www.insidethegames.biz/articles/1078020/iran-taekwondo-silver-medallist-retires-to-become-coach-of-indian-team
12.https://www.tehrantimes.com/news/434541/Bagheri-Motamed-announces-retirement-from-taekwondo
14. بازتاب جهانی حضور معتمد به عنوان سرمربی هند Retrieved (in Persian). www.varzesh3.com
15. افشاگری باقری معتمد ؛ ۳۰ هزار دلار از پولادگر می خواهم medal1.com Retrieved (in Persian).
16. محمد باقری معتمد از دنیای قهرمانی خداحافظی کرد  www.mehrnews.com Retrieved in (in Persian).
17. نفس عمیق" باقری معتمد روی پرده نقره‌ای/ زندگی نایب قهرمان المپیک فیلم شد+فیلم www.farsnews.ir Retrieved in (in Persian).
18. تهران - ايرنا - «محمد باقري معتمد» تكواندوكار پرافتخار كشورمان و دارنده مدال نقره بازي هاي المپيك از دنياي قهرماني خداخافظي كرد www.irna.ir Retrieved in (in Persian).
19. بیوگرافی محمد باقری معتمد www.beytooti.com Retrieved in (in Persian).
20.محمد باقری معتمد تکواندو کار ایرانی, قهرمان تکواندوی جهان و نایب قهرمان المپیک از ایران مهاجرت کرد و به تیم مهماندوست پیوست. namnak.com Retrieved in (in Persian). 
22. Iran’s Bagheri retires to become India’s coach www.wtkmedia.com 
23 محمد باقری معتمد در صفحه فدارسیون تکواندو جمهوری اسلامی ایران  www.iritf.org.ir 
24. باقری معتمد به مدال طلا رسید/ بازگشت نایب قهرمان المپیک با قهرمانی www.tasnimnews.com Retrieved in (in Persian). 
25. معتمد اولین سهمیه تکواندوی ایران در المپیک را گرفت bbc.com Retrieved in (in Persian). 
26. باقری معتمد از فهرست تکواندوکاران جمهوری آذربایجان حذف شد yjc.ir Retrieved in (in Persian). 
27.محمد باقری معتمد نایب قهرمان المپیک راهی هندوستان و آمریکا می‌شود+عکس www.farsnews.ir Retrieved in (in Persian).

External links

Mohammad Bagheri Motamed at bbc.com 

Mohammad Bagheri Motamed at Olympic Channel 

Iranian male taekwondo practitioners
1986 births
Living people
Asian Games gold medalists for Iran
Asian Games medalists in taekwondo
Olympic taekwondo practitioners of Iran
Taekwondo practitioners at the 2012 Summer Olympics
Olympic silver medalists for Iran
Olympic medalists in taekwondo
Taekwondo practitioners at the 2010 Asian Games
Medalists at the 2012 Summer Olympics
Medalists at the 2010 Asian Games
Universiade medalists in taekwondo
Universiade gold medalists for Iran
Universiade silver medalists for Iran
World Taekwondo Championships medalists
Asian Taekwondo Championships medalists
Medalists at the 2005 Summer Universiade
Medalists at the 2007 Summer Universiade
Islamic Solidarity Games medalists in taekwondo
Islamic Solidarity Games competitors for Iran
21st-century Iranian people